Kato'aga is a broad term in the Rotuman language summing up all the intricate ceremonies and gatherings of Rotuman culture. In particular, it refers to the ceremonies involved in celebrating the achievements of people of high rank, or identifying their elevation to important positions of authority within Fiji or internationally. In the past fifteen years, kato'aga have been held for Chief Justice Daniel Fatiaki upon elevation to being the head of Judiciary of Fiji, and to Major General George Konrote when he became Commander of UNIFIL.

Ceremonies
Rotuma